The Spike Island, part of the Passage Group within the Furneaux Group, is a close pair of unpopulated granite islands with a combined area of  , located in Bass Strait, south of Cape Barren Island in Spike Bay just off the west coast of Clarke Island, in Tasmania, in south-eastern Australia.

Fauna
Recorded breeding seabird and wader species include little penguin, Pacific gull, silver gull and sooty oystercatcher.

See also

 List of islands of Tasmania

References

Furneaux Group
Islands of North East Tasmania
Islands of Bass Strait